"1-2-3" is the debut single of British dance music trio the Chimes, written by group members Pauline Henry, Mike Peden, and James Locke. Along with the track "Underestimate", their debut single reached number one for two weeks on the US Billboard Dance Club Songs chart and is also their biggest single. "1-2-3" was the Chimes' only Billboard Hot 100 hit, peaking at number 82. Although the song stalled at number 60 in the band's native UK, it found chart success in New Zealand, where it peaked at number four. In 1990, the song was featured on their debut and only album, The Chimes.

Critical reception
Stewart Mason from AllMusic described the song as "meaty acid house". Paul Lester from Melody Maker felt it "is kinda uptempo, but it glides." A reviewer from Music & Media commented, "A muscular, square beat, a house-oriented piano and a soulful vocal delivery typify this chart-bound club record." Miranda Sawyer from Smash Hits noted Pauline Henry's "remarkable voice" and described the song as "classy" in her review of The Chimes.

Charts

References

1989 songs
1989 debut singles
Acid house songs
CBS Records singles
The Chimes (Scottish band) songs
Song recordings produced by Nellee Hooper
Songs written by Mike Peden